Carl Ignaz Leopold Kny (6 July 1841 – 26 June 1916) was a German botanist, notable as a specialist in research involving the morphology of fungi and cryptogams. He is well known for his production of the Botanische Wandtafeln.

Early life
Kny was born in Breslau on 6 July 1841. At the age of 17, Kny graduated from high school and began to attend the University of Wroclaw. He was inspired by Heinrich Göppert and Ferdinand Cohn, and he decided to devote himself to the study of botany. In 1860, he took up studies in Munich under the direction of Carl Nägeli. He later did academics in Berlin, where he was a pupil of Alexander Braun. He began to collect algae samples from southern Europe for his studies.

Career
Kny became an associate professor at the Friedrich Wilhelm University, as well as director of the newly formed department of plant physiology in 1873. Among his students at Berlin was plant physiologist Hermann Vöchting. Also in 1873, Kny became a member of the Academy of Sciences Leopoldina. In 1880, Kny accepted a position as a professor of botany at the Agricultural University of Berlin, as well as head of the botanical department at Friedrich Wilhelm University. His studies were mostly concerned with the morphology of fungi and cryptograms, especially within the Pteridaceae. Kny also was interested in vascular plants, and he investigated the effects of gravity on growth habit, the anatomy of wood, and the differences of the vascular system between monocots and dicots. In 1908 he became a full honorary professor at Friedrich Wilhelm University. He retired in 1911 but remained as an emeritus. Throughout his career, Kny made 104 publications. 

Between 1874 and 1911, Kny produced his Botanische Wandtafeln. These were a series of 117 botanical wall charts known for their high level of detail, and were widely used in classrooms long after his death. They were accompanied with a 554-page textbook for explanatory purposes. Kny's wall charts are still revered today, and they are housed in several different museums.

Legacy
In 1891, botanist Otto Kuntze named the genus Knyaria in his honor.

His daughter, Hedwig Kny, married Erich Klausener on 1 August 1914 in Düsseldorf.

References

External links
University of Dundee, Museum Services Botanical Wallcharts by Leopold Kny

20th-century German botanists
1841 births
1916 deaths
Scientists from Wrocław
Academic staff of the Humboldt University of Berlin
People from the Province of Silesia
19th-century German botanists